The Frank Rickert Summers House is a historic house located in Kings Mountain, North Carolina. The house is a two-story wood-frame building built in 1928 and recognized for its Tudor Revival style. It was listed in the National Register of Historic Places in 2021.

References 

National Register of Historic Places in Cleveland County, North Carolina